Chymotrypsin-like elastase family member 2A is an enzyme that in humans is encoded by the CELA2A gene.

Function 

Elastases form a subfamily of serine proteases that hydrolyze many proteins in addition to elastin. Humans have six elastase genes which encode the structurally similar proteins elastase 1, 2, 2A, 2B, 3A, and 3B. Like most of the human elastases, elastase 2A is secreted from the pancreas as a zymogen. In other species, elastase 2A has been shown to preferentially cleave proteins after leucine, methionine, and phenylalanine residues. Clinical literature that describes human elastase 1 activity in the pancreas is actually referring to elastase 2A.

References

External links

Further reading